Tobias Draxinger (born January 3, 1985) is a German professional ice hockey defenceman. He is currently playing for EV Landshut of the DEL2. He previously played for Augsburger Panther in the Deutsche Eishockey Liga (DEL).

References

External links
 
 

1985 births
Living people
Augsburger Panther players
Eisbären Berlin players
ERC Ingolstadt players
German ice hockey defencemen
Straubing Tigers players